Christopher Bingham is an American statistician who introduced the Bingham distribution.  In joint work with C. M. D. Godfrey and John Tukey he introduced complex demodulation into the analysis of time series. The Kent distribution, also known as the Fisher–Bingham distribution, is named after Bingham and the English biologist and statistician Ronald Fisher.

References

External links
 Christopher Bingham faculty web page
 

Year of birth missing (living people)
Living people
20th-century American mathematicians
21st-century American mathematicians
Fellows of the American Statistical Association